Ocker Nicolaus "Ok" Formenoij (16 March 1899 – 14 February 1977) was a Dutch association football player. He was part of the Dutch team that finished fourth at the 1924 Summer Olympics; Formenoij played three last games and scored three goals.

In the quarter-final match against Ireland, Formenoij scored at seventh minute, Ireland equalized, and Formenoij scored again in extra time, bringing the Dutch team to the bronze medal match against Sweden. The match ended in a 1-1 draw, and a replay was set up on the next day. The Netherlands lost 1-3 with Formenoij scoring its only goal.

References

External links
 
 

1899 births
1977 deaths
Dutch footballers
Olympic footballers of the Netherlands
Footballers at the 1924 Summer Olympics
Footballers from Rotterdam
Association football forwards
Netherlands international footballers
Feyenoord players
Sparta Rotterdam players